McKinley Freeman (born June 9, 1973) is an American actor and producer. He has appeared in films and on television series, including the starring role of Derek Roman in the drama series Hit the Floor, portraying the role of Dominic in the OWN's drama TV series Queen Sugar, and playing the character Lewis in Hulu's Reasonable Doubt.

Early life 
Freeman earned a BS in finance at University of Illinois at Champaign-Urbana. In 2004 while working at IBM as a Business Development Manager, he auditioned for All My Children and ended up getting the role.

Career 
After working on the soap opera All My Children, he later made appearances on shows such as ER, CSI: Miami, and Criminal Minds. In 2007, he starred as the role Airborne Soldier in the comedy film Delta Farce. In 2009, Freeman became a regular, playing Tony Dane on the ABC's series Samantha Who? Afterwards, he took on some acting roles for a few soap opera series, such as Days of Our Lives, and General Hospital. In 2012, he landed an acting spot on End of Watch. Freeman became a series regular, starring as the character Derek Roman in the drama series Hit the Floor. After three seasons, he left and became a series regular for Daytime Divas and If Loving You Is Wrong.

Personal life 
Freeman stays healthy by practicing a variety of forms of boxing, kickboxing and martial arts, such as Bojuka, Jeet Kune Do, and Muay Thai. He also works with the Covenant House and the Boys & Girls Club of America, while focusing on using his basketball skills in order to help children.

Filmography

Film

Television

Awards and nominations

References

External links 

 
 McKinley Freeman at Rotten Tomatoes

1973 births
Living people
African-American male actors
American male film actors
American male television actors
20th-century American male actors
21st-century American male actors
20th-century African-American people
21st-century African-American people